McWhorter is a surname. Notable people with the surname include:

Bob McWhorter (1891–1960), American football player
Diane McWhorter (born 1952), American historian and journalist
George McWhorter (1833–1891), American politician from Florida
Hamilton McWhorter III (1921-2008), American naval aviator
Henry C. McWhorter (1836–1913), American politician from West Virginia
John McWhorter (born 1965), American linguist and political commentator
Lucullus Virgil McWhorter (1860–1944), American farmer and archaeologist
Robert McWhorter (1819-1908), American politician from Georgia
R. Clayton McWhorter (1933–2016), American businessman 
William A. McWhorter (1918–1944), American soldier

See also
The McWhorter School of Pharmacy
McWhorter, West Virginia
Justice McWhorter (disambiguation)
William Hamilton McWhorter Jordan